The following is a list of programs broadcast by All TV, a Philippine free-to-air broadcast television network owned and operated by Advanced Media Broadcasting System (AMBS).

Current original programs

Variety
 Wowowin

Talk
 M.O.M.S — Mhies on a Mission 
  Negosyo Goals 
 Toni

Public affairs
 Kuha All!

Current syndicated programs

Foreign drama
 Hot Mom 
 Miracle

Film presentation
 All Flix 
 All Flix: Noon Fix
 All Flix: Sabado Hits
 All Flix: Linggo Hits

News
 News Night

Magazine
  Island Living

Comedy
 Oh My Dad!

ABS-CBN programs
Drama
 Doble Kara 
 Sandugo 
 Till I Met You

Previous programs

Original programs
Talk
 Toni Talks 

Music
 InstaJam 
 K-Lite Radio TV

Syndicated programs
Foreign drama
 Again My Life 
 From Now On, Showtime! 
 River Where the Moon Rises 
Why Her 
Woori the Virgin 

ABS-CBN programs
 Ngayon at Kailanman 
 Sana Dalawa ang Puso

Specials
 13th PMPC Star Awards for Music 
 Manny Pacquiao vs. DK Yoo 
 Miss Earth 2022

Infomercial
 EZ Shop Asia

References

External links

ALLTV on YouTube
ALLTV Entertainment on YouTube

Advanced Media Broadcasting System
Lists of television series by network
Philippine television-related lists